The Nexus Task Force analyzes issues at the intersection of Israel and antisemitism. It has published a White Paper, titled "Understanding Antisemitism at its Nexus with Israel and Zionism", and a "Guide to Identifying Antisemitism in Debates about Israel". The White Paper has been described as "a new working definition of antisemitism [...] that challenges the one being promoted by Jewish establishment groups", namely the IHRA definition. Kenneth S. Stern, who had been the lead drafter of the IHRA definition and its examples, is an ex officio member of the Nexus Task Force.

In September 2020, "more than 100 prominent Jewish leaders" sent a letter to Joe Biden, endorsing the work of the Nexus Task Force.

The Nexus Task Force is affiliated with The Bard Center for the Study of Hate (BCSH). The BCSH works to increase the serious study of human hatred, and ways to combat it. The director of the Nexus Task Force is Jonathan Jacoby. The director of the BCSH is Kenneth S. Stern.

Nexus Task Force members 
The members of the Nexus Task Force are listed below. The names of task force members who are described in individual Wikipedia articles have been linked to those articles; the names of other task force members have been linked to their biographies on the Nexus Task Force Web site.

The Nexus Task Force is supported by a larger advisory committee.

Reception 
Haaretz published a balanced article about the three definitions (IHRA, Nexus Task Force and Jerusalem Declaration on Antisemitism), which concludes "The new documents, then, may have achieved their goal of opening up the conversation, but consensus among Jews on what antisemitism is looks like  – and how it relates to how Israel is discussed – seems further away than ever."

An article by Ira Forman in the Moment is mildly critical of the Nexus Task Force and the Jerusalem Declaration on Antisemitism, and concludes "These two new definitions focus on issues worthy of debate and analysis. But their guidelines represent the views of a smaller constituency. [...] From a practical perspective, the widespread adoption by dozens of countries, scores of law enforcement organizations and hundreds of governmental, educational and non-profit institutions means we should not relitigate the language of IHRA."

Another article by Ira Forman, this time in The Detroit Jewish News, is again mildly critical of both the Nexus Task Force and the Jerusalem Declaration on Antisemitism, and concludes "There is no doubt that false and reckless charges of antisemitism are a hindrance to the battle against antisemitism. But rather than campaign for an alternative tool, those involved in the fight should support the continued use of the IHRA Definition [...]".

The Forward wrote, in a balanced article, that "The new definition could serve as an alternative to one from the International Holocaust Remembrance Alliance [...]".

A more critical article in The Forward states that the Nexus Task Force's "[...] endeavor, while undoubtedly well-meaning, is unnecessary and possibly dangerous."

A long, balanced article in The Jerusalem Post states that "For outsiders to the conflict, it’s hard to understand what the fight is about. The IHRA, JDA, and Nexus definitions have many similarities and overlaps. It is in the distinctions, views on double standards, self-determination and legitimate criticism, that counter-antisemitism activists and political activists clash."

The Jerusalem Post also carried a short, balanced article by Ron Kampeas, with the lead paragraph "Paying disproportionate attention to Israel and treating Israel differently than other countries is not prima facie proof of anti-Semitism."

The same article by Ron Kampeas appeared in The Times of Israel, with the lead paragraph "Nexus Task Force [...] says IHRA definition is too broad, not all double standards toward Jewish state manifest prejudice".

See also 

 Working definition of antisemitism

References 

Opposition to antisemitism
Definition of antisemitism controversy